Mali national basketball team (French: Équipe nationale de basket-ball de Mali) represents Mali in men's international basketball competitions has yet to appear in the FIBA World Championship. Their best finish at the FIBA Africa Championship was in 1972 where they ended with a bronze medal.

African Championship record
 Morocco 1964 – 6th
 Morocco 1968 – 4th
 Senegal 1972 – 3rd
 Central African Rep. 1974 – 7th
 Tunisia 1987 – 4th
 Angola 1989 – 4th
 Egypt 1992 – 4th
 Kenya 1993 – 7th
 Algeria 1995 – 5th
 Senegal 1997 – 6th
 Angola 1999 – 4th
 Morocco 2001 – 11th
 Algeria 2005 – 8th
 Angola 2007 – 11th
 Libya 2009 – 8th
 Madagascar 2011 – 9th
 Côte d'Ivoire 2013 – 15th
 Tunisia 2015 – 7th
 Senegal/Tunisia 2017 – 9th
 Rwanda 2021 – 15th

Team

Current roster
Roster for the AfroBasket 2021.

Past rosters
Team for the 2013 FIBA Africa Championship.

Head coach position
José Ruiz – 2011–2013

See also
Mali national under-19 basketball team

References

External links
FIBA profile

Basketball in Mali
Men's national basketball teams
Basketball